Central Trust Building may refer to:

Central Trust Building, the former name of the Fourth and Vine Tower, in Cincinnati
Central Trust Company Buildings, Pennsylvania